= Music for Dreaming =

- Origin: Melbourne, Victoria, Australia
- Genre: Classical
- Years active: 1992–present
- Website: www.musicfordreaming.com

Music for Dreaming was founded by Cherie Ross in 1992 with the vision "to solve sleep problems, deepen the bond between mother and baby, and reduce stress in the most fragile infants."

In Music for Dreaming, the rhythm replicates the human heartbeat and its tempo is that of the resting human pulse. The continuous flow of the music creates a sense of calm and its duration is designed to support a baby's sleep cycle. Music for Dreaming is used in sleep clinics and specialised mother-baby units as a learning tool for mothers to settle their babies. In addition, the music is used during labour for pain relief, in breastfeeding to enhance the let-down reflex and to assist the newborn in nutritive sucking.

The music of Music for Dreaming is performed by musicians from the Melbourne Symphony Orchestra.

== Discography ==
=== Albums ===
List of albums, with selected chart positions and certifications
Title	Album details	Peak chart positions	Certifications
Title	Album details	AUS	Certifications
Music for Dreaming aka Music for Dreaming for Baby	Released: 1995; Label: Sound Impressions/Sony (MDCD001)	98	ARIA: 2× Platinum
Music for Dreaming II aka Music for Dreaming for You	Released: 2003; Label: Sound Impressions/Sony (MDCD003)		
Music for Dreaming: Christmas aka Christmas Symphony	Released: 2003; Label: Sound Impressions/Sony (MDCD002)		
Fur Baby Sleep Symphony	Released: 2016; Label: Sound Impressions		
